Saint-Amand-Montrond is a commune in the Cher department in the Centre-Val de Loire region of France and the historical province of Bourbonnais.

Saint-Amand-Montrond literally translates to Saint Amand round hill, despite not being on a round hill.

Geography
The town was built in the basin of the eastern banks of the Cher which separates it from the commune of Orval, to which it is connected by two bridges.

A small river, the Marmande, joins the Cher here, and the canal de Berry crosses the commune from southeast to southwest. Some flooding is common because of the nearby marshes. The town is the capital of the small region of Boischaut, known for its woodland and cattle pastures.

Population

History
The settlement of Saint-Amand goes back to prehistoric times. Evidence of Roman occupation has also been discovered here. An abbey was founded here around the year 620 by a monk called Theodulph. The commune was created after the French Revolution by the amalgamation of three separate small towns that had grown up during the Middle Ages: Saint Amand le Chastel, Montrond and Saint Amand sous Montrond.

Sights
 The church of Saint Amandus, dating from the eleventh century.
 Several houses dating from the fifteenth century.
 The church of a Carmelite convent dating from the fifteenth century.
 A chapel from the convent, nowadays the town hall (hôtel de ville).
 Château de Montrond, a thirteenth-century castle, a historic site.
 The chateau of La Férolle.
 Vestiges of the twelfth-century castle of Saint-Amand-le-Chatel.
 The museum of Saint-Vic.

Notable people
 Jean-Baptiste Lemire (1867–1945), composer.
 Louis Lecoin (1888–1971), pacifist and libertarian, was born in Saint-Amand-Montrond.
 Maurice Papon (1910–2007), mayor of Saint-Amand-Montrond (1971–1983) and collaborator during World War II.
 Serge Vinçon (1949–2007), college professor and politician was born here.
 Jean Godin des Odonais, cartographer and explorer, lived here.
 Julian Alaphilippe and his younger brother Bryan Alaphilippe, both cyclists, are from here.
 Érick Jacquin, French chef naturalized Brazilian, was born here.

Economy
The town is noted for its goldsmiths and jewellers. It has 9 companies specialising in gold work as well as a professional school dedicated to jewellery.

Two large printing companies, Bussière and Clerc, produce large volumes of books and magazines.

Sport

Cycling:
The Tour de France has finished in the town three times. In 2001 , it was the finishing line of a 61 km individual time trial from Montluçon .  The stage was won by American Lance Armstrong of Discovery Channel Cycling Team. It featured again in the 2008 edition, again as a finish for an individual time trial. German Stefan Schumacher won the 53 km long stage from Cérilly. In 2013 stage 13 finished here from Tours and was won by British sprinter Mark Cavendish.

Twin towns
 Nottuln, in Germany
 Otwock, Poland
 Riobamba, Ecuador

See also
Prix Alain-Fournier - literary prize awarded at the town's annual book fair

References

External links

Official website of the town 
Annuaire Mairie website 
L'abbaye de Noirlac

Communes of Cher (department)
Subprefectures in France
Bourbonnais